Antiqua, antique in Latin, may refer to :
 Antiqua (typeface class), a typeface family designed between about 1470 and 1600
 a Yersinia pestis biovar thought to correspond to the Plague of Justinian
 A common misspelling of Antigua, almost always referring to the nation of Antigua and Barbuda.

See also
 Antique (disambiguation)
 Antigua (disambiguation)